Iarova is a commune in Soroca District, Moldova. It is composed of three villages: Balinți, Balinții Noi and Iarova.

Notable people
 Efimie Palii

References

Communes of Soroca District
Populated places on the Dniester